Amy's Choice may refer to:

 Amy's Choice (TV miniseries), a 2002 miniseries by Sharon Lam
 "Amy's Choice" (Doctor Who), a 2010 episode of Doctor Who